Carex interior is a species of sedge known by the common name inland sedge. It is native to much of North America from Alaska to northern Mexico to the mid-Atlantic United States. It grows in wet habitat, most often in calcareous soils. This sedge produces clumps of stems approaching a meter in maximum height, with a few leaves at each stem. The inflorescence is an open array of star-shaped spikes of flowers covered with gold scales. The fruit is coated in a toothed, red-tipped perigynium.

External links
Jepson Manual Treatment
USDA Plants Profile
Flora of North America
Photo gallery

interior
Flora of California
Plants described in 1893
Flora without expected TNC conservation status
Taxa named by Liberty Hyde Bailey